Cara Jocelyn Delevingne (born 12 August 1992) is an English model and actress. She signed with Storm Management after leaving school in 2009. Delevingne won Model of the Year at the British Fashion Awards in 2012 and 2014.

Delevingne started her acting career with a minor role in the 2012 film adaptation of Anna Karenina by Joe Wright. Her most notable roles include Margo Roth Spiegelman in the romantic mystery film Paper Towns (2015), the Enchantress in the comic book film Suicide Squad (2016), and Laureline in Luc Besson's Valerian and the City of a Thousand Planets (2017).

Early life
Cara Jocelyn Delevingne was born on 12 August 1992, in Hammersmith, London. Her father is property developer Charles Hamar Delevingne. She grew up in Belgravia, London. She has two older sisters, including Poppy Delevingne, and a paternal half-brother. Delevingne's maternal grandfather was publishing executive and English Heritage chairman Sir Jocelyn Stevens, the nephew of magazine publisher Sir Edward George Warris Hulton and the grandson of newspaper proprietor Sir Edward Hulton, 1st Baronet.

Her maternal grandmother Janie Sheffield, a granddaughter of the 6th Baronet Sheffield, was lady-in-waiting to Princess Margaret. Through one of her maternal great-great-grandfathers, Sir Lionel Lawson Faudel-Phillips, 3rd Baronet, Delevingne descends from the Anglo-Jewish Faudel-Phillips baronets; two of her ancestors on that line served as Lord Mayor of London. Her godparents are Dame Joan Collins and Sir Nicholas Coleridge.

Delevingne attended Francis Holland School for Girls in central London until she was 16 before moving to Bedales School in Steep, Hampshire. She has dyspraxia and found school challenging. In June 2015, in an interview with Vogue, Delevingne talked about her battle with depression when she was 15: "I was hit with a massive wave of depression and anxiety and self-hatred, where the feelings were so painful that I would slam my head against a tree to try to knock myself out." At 16, after completing her GCSEs, she moved to Bedales School in Hampshire to focus on drama and music. After one year, she dropped out and followed her sister Poppy into modelling.

Career

2002–2011: Career beginnings and public breakthrough

Delevingne had her first modelling job at age ten in an editorial shot by Bruce Weber for Vogue Italia alongside model Lady Eloise Anson. She signed with Storm Management in 2009. She worked in the industry for a year before booking a paying job and went through two seasons of castings before landing her first runway show.

Delevingne was scouted by Burberry's Christopher Bailey in 2012 while working part-time in the office of a fashion website. Bailey cast her in the company's spring/summer 2011 campaign.

Delevingne's first catwalk appearance was at the February 2011 London Fashion Week, walking for the Burberry Prorsum A/W collection. Later that year, she opened and closed the Burberry Prorsum S/S 2012 collection.

She commenced the early 2012 season by walking in the Chanel Haute-Couture spring show at the Grand Palais.

New York Fashion Week was the first of the "big four" fashion weeks, where Delevingne walked in nine shows for fashion houses including Jason Wu, Rag & Bone, Thakoon, Donna Karan, Tory Burch, Oscar de la Renta and Carolina Herrera. During London Fashion Week, she exclusively walked for the Burberry Prorsum Womenswear A/W 2012 show. She walked in six shows during the Milan Fashion Week, and walked for Fendi, Trussardi, Moschino, Blumarine, DSquared2 and Dolce & Gabbana.

Paris Fashion Week was the final week of Fashion Month, in which she walked in seven shows for Nina Ricci, Sonia Rykiel, Cacharel, Stella McCartney, Paul & Joe, Kenzo and Chanel. This was the beginning of what would turn out to be a longlasting professional relationship with Chanel's head designer and creative director, Karl Lagerfeld. In an interview with Elle after the show, Lagerfeld said, "Cara is different. She's full of life, full of pep. I like girls to be wild but at the same time beautifully brought up and very funny."

The international Fashion Month began again in September 2012, to showcase spring/summer collections for 2013. During New York Fashion Week, she walked for designers including Marc Jacobs, Oscar de la Renta and Marchesa. She walked exclusively for Burberry in London. She followed this appearance by walking in shows for Sass & Bide, Issa, Preen, Topshop, Mary Katrantzou, Giles, and Matthew Williamson.

For Milan Fashion Week, she walked for Moschino, Emilio Pucci, Ermanno Scervino, Ports 1961, Anteprima, Iceberg, Gabriele Colangelo, Anthony Vaccarello, and Just Cavalli. For Paris Fashion Week, she walked for designers such as Cacharel, Louis Vuitton, and Costume National. Over this season she had walked in over 50 shows. Delevingne then went on to appear in the Victoria's Secret Fashion Show on 7 November 2012. She featured in the 'Pink is US' section and walked during Justin Bieber's performance of 'Beauty And A Beat'. The show aired on 4 December 2012.

She took part in the Chanel pre-fall 2013 show in Scotland with the runway around the courtyard of Linlithgow Palace. The collection, designed by Karl Lagerfeld, was called "Paris-Edimbourg" and inspired by Scottish style using tartan fabrics. The show renewed media interest in the possibility of restoring the roof of the palace. Delevingne walked in the Chanel Haute-Couture spring show and followed this up with an appearance in the Valentino Haute Couture show before flying to New York to take part in New York Fashion Week, the first fashion week of the year.

Her first appearance in New York was for Jason Wu. She subsequently walked for Rag & Bone, Tommy Hilfiger, Diane von Furstenberg, Marc by Marc Jacobs, Rodarte, Derek Lam, DKNY, Carolina Herrera, Tory Burch, Jeremy Scott, Oscar de la Renta, Michael Kors, Anna Sui and finally Marc Jacobs' rearranged show, due to a delay in transportation of goods for the show due to the February 2013 nor'easter.

During London Fashion Week she walked for Sister by Sibling, Issa, Topshop, Mulberry, Matthew Williamson, Peter Pilotto, Burberry, and Giles. After this Delevingne walked in another seven shows at the Milan Fashion Week for Fendi, Ports 1961, DSquared2, Etro, Versace, Iceberg and Pucci. In Paris, Delevingne walked in eleven shows for Katie Grand's collaboration with Tod's Hogan brand, H&M, Lanvin, Vanessa Bruno, Jean Paul Gaultier, John Galliano, Stella McCartney, Yves Saint Laurent, Chanel, Hakaan and Louis Vuitton. Delevingne's association with Katie Grand's collection went further than a catwalk show appearance as Delevingne sung 'I Want Candy' in the mini film called 'Gang', which is the title of the Katie Grand Loves Hogan 2013 collection and the name of the large-format magazine created to celebrate the collaboration. In between the two international catwalk seasons, Delevingne was featured in Chanel's Cruise show which took place in Singapore. It was the first time Chanel had held this event in Asia and was held at the Loewen Cluster at Dempsey Hill, a British army barracks turned Singapore Armed Forces manpower base.

The international fashion weeks began again in September 2013, to showcase spring/summer collections for 2014, in which Delevingne appeared. In London, she walked in five shows. She opened for Mulberry and closed for Burberry and Topshop as well as walking Peter Pilotto and Giles. In Milan, Delevingne only walked for Fendi; she walked in just three shows in Paris for Stella McCartney, Chanel and Valentino. She rounded off the year by again appearing in the Victoria's Secret Fashion Show.

2012–2014: Transition to acting and continued modelling

Delevingne played her first film role in the 2012 film adaptation of Anna Karenina, as Princess Sorokina, the marriage interest of Count Vronsky, alongside Keira Knightley. In August 2013, Delevingne voiced a DJ of a pop radio station in the video game Grand Theft Auto V, which once released became the fastest-selling entertainment product in history.

Delevingne went on to play the part of Melanie in the British psychological thriller film The Face of an Angel, accompanied by Daniel Brühl and Kate Beckinsale. The film received mixed reviews, but many critics commended Delevingne's performance. One such example is The Metro which commented that, "In her first major film role, she proves she can act with a sweet and playful on-screen presence. She brings a sense of vitality that is desperately missing from the rest of the film."

On 24 October 2014, she starred in a sketch for an annual 90-minute comedy TV event called The Feeling Nuts Comedy Night, which aired on Channel 4 and was designed to raise awareness of testicular cancer. A month later, she featured in South African group Die Antwoord's music video for their song Ugly Boy. Then in December 2014, Delevingne starred in Reincarnation, a short film by Karl Lagerfeld for Chanel alongside Pharrell Williams and Geraldine Chaplin.

In Milan, she opened Fendi's F/W 2014 collection for Karl Lagerfeld, before modelling for Stella McCartney in Paris. Her absence in New York was noticed due to Delevingne going from walking in 'just about every single show out there' to only walking in the Marc Jacobs show in 2013. News outlets wrote headlines such as, "Will Cara Delevingne Walk in New York Fashion Week?" in the run up to the fashion week.

Delevingne appeared in a Burberry fragrance advertisement alongside British supermodel Kate Moss.

In the second international fashion month, she opened and closed Topshop's 'Unique S/S 15' collection in London, before going to Milan, where she also opened the Fendi S/S 15 show. In Paris, she walked in four shows for Givenchy, Yves Saint Laurent, Chanel and Stella McCartney. She finished 2014 with the Metiers d'Art Pre-Fall 2015/2016 collection showcase. The event was held at the Hotel Schloss Leopoldskron in Salzburg, Austria.

On 10 March, Delevingne closed the showcase of Chanel's Paris-Salzberg collection and closed a reshow of the collection in New York on 31 March.

In 2015, Delevingne appeared in advertisements for YSL Beauté, co-starring French model Cindy Bruna. She also appeared in advertisements for DKNY (including a menswear campaign), Tag Heuer, Penshoppe, Pepe Jeans, Burberry, Alexander Wang, and Mango reuniting with Kate Moss.

Delevingne appeared on a solo cover of Vogue, as well as The Wall Street Journal, and Love alongside Kendall Jenner, among others.

In 2016, Delevingne became the face of Rimmel alongside Kate Moss and Georgia May Jagger.

She continued appearing in ads for Burberry, Tag Heuer, Chanel, Marc Jacobs, YSL, and Puma.

In 2017, Delevingne appeared on the cover of the online magazine The Edit by luxury fashion retailer Net-a-Porter. She also appeared on the cover of Glamour, V, British GQ, Vogue Paris, Elle UK, Elle Australia, and Glamour Germany. She began appearing in Dior Beauty advertisements.

In June 2014, Delevingne made her TV debut opposite veteran British actress Sylvia Syms in the final episode of Playhouse Presents. This was a series of self-contained TV plays, made by British broadcaster Sky Arts.

In January 2014, Delevingne opened and closed the Chanel Haute Couture Spring 2014 show. In the A/W 2014 collection showcases she went on to close Burberry's show in the London Fashion Week and appear in fellow British designer Giles' collection.

2015–present: Acting breakthrough and modelling hiatus

It was noted by many that Delevingne had started to become more selective with the shows she appeared in. This was the beginning of the decrease in volume of catwalk roles, the cause of which at the time was put down to her expanding acting career. However, in a Time essay published in 2016, Delevingne explained the real cause for the decrease of show appearances:

In February 2015, Delevingne appeared in ASAP Ferg's music video for his song Dope Walk. Later in May 2015, she was also in Taylor Swift's star studded "Bad Blood" music video which went on to break Vevo's 24-hour viewing record, with 20.1 million views in its day of release.

Delevingne co-starred in the adaptation of John Green's novel, Paper Towns (2015), as Margo Roth Spiegelman. The film brought in $12,650,140 on the opening weekend in the US, which placed it 6th at the box office. Rotten Tomatoes' critical consensus reads, "Paper Towns isn't as deep or moving as it wants to be, yet it's still earnest, well-acted, and thoughtful enough to earn a place in the hearts of teen filmgoers of all ages." Of Delevingne's performance, Justin Chang of Variety called her "the real find of the film", suggesting that "on the evidence of her work here, this striking actress is here to stay".

She played a mermaid in the 2015 fantasy film Pan. In 2016, Delevingne co-starred as Enchantress, a villainess with magical abilities, in Suicide Squad, an action film based on the DC comic book series of the same name. The film was released to generally negative reviews, although it was a box office success. Delevingne's performance received mixed reviews from critics.

The film Kids in Love, a British coming of age drama, was released in 2016. The cast includes many up and coming young actors, with Will Poulter and Alma Jodorowsky as lead roles alongside Sebastian de Souza and Delevingne who plays the role of Viola.

Delevingne starred with Dane DeHaan and Rihanna in the Luc Besson film Valerian and the City of a Thousand Planets, an adaptation of the comic book series Valérian and Laureline. The film began shooting in December 2015, and was released in July 2017.

Delevingne plays Annetje in the period romance film Tulip Fever. She also plays the role of Kath Talent in the film London Fields, based on the 1989 novel of the same name by Martin Amis.

The Amazon Prime Video fantasy steampunk series Carnival Row features Delevingne in the female lead role (opposite Orlando Bloom) as Vignette Stonemoss, a faerie war refugee. In 2022 she joined the cast of Only Murders in the Building for its second season.

Other ventures
In October 2017, Delevingne made her debut as a novelist of young adult fiction with her new book Mirror, Mirror, which contains an LGBT theme, co-written with British writer Rowan Coleman. According to Delevingne, she wanted to "tell a story that gives the reader a realistic picture of the turbulent roller-coaster teenage years."

Delevingne sings and plays the drums and guitar. Over 2011 and 2012, Delevingne wrote and recorded two albums of music under artist manager Simon Fuller and was subsequently offered a record deal. However, she turned the deal down due to the fact that her name would be changed. In 2013, she recorded an acoustic duet cover version of Sonnentanz with British soul and jazz singer-songwriter Will Heard. She covered The Strangeloves "I Want Candy" in the mini film called Gang, which was the title of the 2013 A/W Katie Grand Loves Hogan collection and the name of the large-format magazine created to celebrate the collaboration.

In 2020 Delevigne - together with her older sisters Chloe and Poppy - launched Della Vite, a line of vegan Prosecco.

In December 2022 Delevingne featured in her series Planet Sex for BBC Three, shown over six episodes, exploring sexuality including her own, in various worldwide locations.

Fashion
Delevingne teamed up with Pharrell Williams to make the song "CC the World", which was used for the short Chanel film Reincarnation in which both Pharrell and Delevingne star. This was released to the public on 1 December 2014. The duo performed the song before a live audience for the Chanel show at the Park Avenue Armory in New York City in March 2015. On 28 July 2017, Delevingne released the music video for her song "I Feel Everything" from Valerian and the City of a Thousand Planets. Delevingne's background vocals are featured on the song "Pills" from the 2017 studio album, Masseduction, by American musician St. Vincent, whom Delevingne previously dated from 2014 to 2016. Her backing vocals are featured on the title track of Fiona Apple's 2020 album, Fetch the Bolt Cutters.
Delevingne has designed two fashion collections for DKNY and Mulberry. Her DKNY capsule collection featured a variety of sporty street style items ranging from beanie hats to leather jackets. DKNY described the collection as "mostly unisex". The collection took approximately two years from the first announcement to when it was released on 15 October 2014.

Delevingne has also designed four collections for Mulberry featuring rucksacks and handbags. The collection also consisted of purses, iPad sleeves, phone covers, zipped pouches, and passport holders. The fourth and latest collection was released 3 June 2015.

Public image
Delevingne was named by the Evening Standard as one of London's "1,000 Most Influential People of 2011", in the category Most Invited. In 2013, the Evening Standard also ranked her 20th on their "Power 1000" list "because of her domination of the catwalks at London Fashion Week and her huge social media following". The same year, Delevingne was the most googled fashion figure and the most re-blogged model on Tumblr.

In March 2014, Delevingne was included in The Sunday Times Magazines "100 Makers of the 21st Century" list of influential British people. Later that year, she was ranked sixth on the "World's Highest-Paid Models" list by Forbes, earning an estimated US$3.5 million (£2.7 million). By 2015, she had moved up to second on this list, earning $9 million (£7 million).

Delevingne has also appeared twice in categories run by AskMen, ranking at number 13 on their "Top 99 Most Desirable Women" list in 2014 and at number 40 on their "Crush List: Top 99 Women" in 2016.

Personal life
Delevingne openly identifies as bisexual and pansexual. In June 2015, she confirmed that she was in a relationship with American musician St. Vincent. They separated in September 2016. In May 2018, Delevingne came out as genderfluid. She uses she/her pronouns. In June 2019, she confirmed that she was in a relationship with actress and model Ashley Benson. In April 2020, the couple split after two years of dating.

Delevingne is a self-described animal lover. Following the killing of Cecil the lion in 2015, she auctioned off her personal TAG Heuer watch in aid of wildlife conservation, raising £18,600 for WildCRU.

At the Women in the World summit in October 2015, Delevingne spoke about her battle with depression, which began at age 15, when she discovered her mother's drug addiction. The following year, she left school for six months and agreed to go on medication, which she said may have saved her life. In 2017, on This Morning, she revealed that she also has ADHD.

In October 2017, Delevingne alleged that circa 2016, producer Harvey Weinstein sexually harassed her, attempted to kiss her without consent, and propositioned her for a threesome in a hotel room in exchange for a role. Despite declining, she was still cast in the film, but says she regretted it because his actions terrified her. The Weinstein Company produced the 2017 film Tulip Fever, which starred Delevigne. She also alleges that circa 2014, he told her she would never work as an "actress" in Hollywood because of her sexuality.

Delevingne has several tattoos. Her first tattoo was a lion on her finger, representing her zodiac sign of Leo. She has a tattoo of her lucky number, the Roman numeral XII, on her side under her right arm, and "MADE IN ENGLAND" on the sole of her left foot. She has said that her most important tattoo is the elephant on her right arm, in memory of her late grandmother. Her initials "CJD" are on her hand.

She has a diamond on her ear and a Southern cross around her ear; a white dove on her finger; "silence" on her wrist; a sak yant on her back; a snake on her hand; a pair of eyes on her neck; a coat of arms on her ribcage; her mother's name on her biceps muscle; "breathe deep" on her other biceps; "bacon..." under her foot; a DD monogram on her hip, symbolising her friendship with fellow model Jourdan Dunn; a wasp on her finger; "don't worry be happy" on her sternum; a heart on her finger; and a smiley face on her toe.

Filmography

Film

Television

Web

Music videos

Director

Video game

Commercials

Discography

Bibliography

See also
 LGBT culture in New York City
 List of LGBT people from New York City

References

External links

 
 

1992 births
21st-century English actors
21st-century English novelists
21st-century English singers
Actors from London
British fashion designers
Cara
English models
English film actors
English people of Canadian descent
English people of Jewish descent
Fashion designers from London
Hulton family
English LGBT actors
LGBT models
English LGBT novelists
Living people
Models from London
LGBT fashion designers
Non-binary models
People educated at Bedales School
People educated at Francis Holland School
People from Hammersmith
Writers from London
21st-century English LGBT people
Pansexual non-binary people
Bisexual non-binary people
Bisexual novelists
Bisexual singers
British non-binary actors
Genderfluid people
People with attention deficit hyperactivity disorder